David Valcin is an American actor. He was born in Staten Island, and raised in Brooklyn and Quebec. He began acting in High School in a community theater called The Jubilee Players. Valcin studied at Earlham College in Richmond, Indiana and later studied acting at The Atlantic Theater Company in New York City and Vermont. He is best known for his recurring role as Anthony Marconi also known as Scarface, on the action drama Person of Interest.

Some of his other television acting credits include Just Shoot Me!, The Practice, The Guardian, Law & Order, Law & Order: Criminal Intent, Rescue Me, Third Watch, The Good Wife and Monk as well as having a recurring role as Eddie Fairbanks on the sitcom Two of a Kind (1998–1999), starring Mary-Kate and Ashley Olsen. He appeared in thirteen out of the twenty-two episodes of that series.

He has also appeared in the films Crocodile 2: Death Swamp (2002) and New Year's Eve (2011).

He currently lives in Manhattan, New York.

References

External links

Year of birth missing (living people)
Living people
Male actors from New York City
20th-century American male actors
21st-century American male actors
American male film actors
American male television actors
People from Brooklyn